Dotrščina is a forest park in the northeast of Zagreb, Croatia. It is a protected area as the Dotrščina Memorial Cemetery and Park of the Revolution, because it is the historical site of mass executions in World War II. It is located north of the Maksimir forest park and south of the Medvednica mountain, and includes 365 cadastral acres (approx. 2 km2), mostly of forested area.

History 
During the time of Zagreb in World War II, starting from May 1941, the Ustasha brought their victims here day and night, and killed them systematically. Victims were most often thrown into common pits, and therefore there is no insight into where anyone was buried. According to the latest research from 1985, it was estimated that around 7,000 anti-fascists were executed here, including around 2,000 members of the Communist Party of Yugoslavia and the League of Communist Youth of Yugoslavia. Some notable Croatian intelectualls who were executed here were Ivan Krndelj, Dr Božidar Adžija, Otokar Keršovani, Ognjen Prica, Viktor Rosenzweig, Zvonimir Richtmann, Ivo Kuhn, Simo Crnogorac and August Cesarec.

Park landscaping 
In 1963, the Institute for the Protection of Cultural Monuments of the City of Zagreb signed a contract with sculptor Vojin Bakić, Dr Josip Seissel, Silvana Seissel and Angela Ratković for the spatial design and conceptual horticultural solution of the Dotrščina park, which included the conceptual solution of the Valley of Graves, conceptual solution of the old entrance area from Svetošimunska road and models of two sculptures made of provisional material.

The arrangement of this park was completed in 1968 when Bakić's monument to the Dotršćina victims was finally erected on the plateau at the entrance from Svetošimunska road. In addition to the central crystalline shaped monument made of stainless steel, Bakić created six to seven crystalline sculptures in the Valley of Graves, one of the largest execution grounds in Dotrščina. The entire area and the slopes are covered with ivy so that the victims would be more peaceful. In addition to the memorials, along the road that goes through the Valley of the Graves, there are marble plaques with carved verses by Ivan Goran Kovačić and Jure Kaštelan.

All surfaces and lines on the central sculpture in Dotrščina are reduced to a minimum and simplicity, which creates a certain play of light and shadow, depending on the angle of observation. With this sculpture, Bakić does not define for the visitor what happened here, the sculpture is only an abstract dedication to all those shot there, devoid of any narrative or ideology.

Park content 
Dotrščina Memorial Park consists of the following memorial complexes:

Unrealized plans 
The plan also included the creation of memorials to the people of Zagreb who died in the People's Liberation Movement on other fronts in Yugoslavia, on the allied fronts outside Yugoslavia, in the Spanish Civil War, in the October Revolution, memorial museum and a commemorative area with the names of the victims. Due to economic and political changes in the 1990s, further construction of the monuments in the park was suspended.

References

Literature 
 Dr Stipe Ugarković and Ivan Očak. Zagreb grad heroj: Spomen obilježja revoluciji. Publisher: August Cesarec, Zagreb 1979
 Mario Šimunković and Domagoj Delač. Sjećanje je borba, Publisher: SABARH, Zagreb 2013

External links 

 Dotršćina Memorial Site
 Spomenik database: Dotršćina

Buildings and structures in Zagreb
World War II memorials in Croatia
Massacres in the Independent State of Croatia